Escape Artists Motion Pictures is an Indian film production studio established by producers Madan and James. Formed in 2010, it has since gone on to produce several Tamil language films. They have also acted as distributors for several Tamil films since 2010.

Career 
Escape Artists Motion Pictures was first announced in an article by the Economic Times in 2009, and it was announced that the studio would collaborate with to be the producers of Gautham Vasudev Menon's Vinnaithaandi Varuvaayaa alongside VTV Ganesh and RS Infotainment's Elred Kumar and R. Jayaraman. The romantic coming-of-age story featured Silambarasan and Trisha Krishnan in the lead roles, while A. R. Rahman composed the film's score and soundtrack. Upon release, it achieved positive reviews, with several critics giving "modern classic" status, whilst also becoming a commercially successful venture.

Filmography

Producer

Distributor

References

External links 
Official Site

2012 establishments in Tamil Nadu
Film production companies based in Chennai
Indian film studios